Oriole GO Station is a small train station on GO Transit's Richmond Hill line. It is located under the Highway 401 overpass, west of Leslie Street in the North York district of Toronto, Ontario, Canada. It is about half a kilometre south of Leslie subway station on Line 4 Sheppard of the Toronto Transit Commission.

A pedestrian walkway along the east side of tracks connects the north end of the platform to Esther Shiner Boulevard and a short walk along Old Leslie Street leads to the upper, automated entrance to the subway station. It has been proposed several times that the GO station should be moved to allow for a direct connection with the subway.

There is a narrow footbridge over the track, allowing pedestrians to walk between the station to Woodsworth Road. This bridge will be replaced by a new, wider bridge farther south. The  metre bridge will be enclosed in a mesh safety screen and have an anti-slip floor.

Nearby points of interest include the Concord Park Place condominium complex, IKEA North York, and North York General Hospital.

Connecting transit
Toronto Transit Commission services in the vicinity of Oriole GO Station include:

 Line 4 Sheppard subway trains at Leslie station 
 51 Leslie bus at Leslie station
 85 Sheppard East bus along Sheppard Avenue
 115 Silver Hills on Woodsworth Road, west of the station

CNR Oriole station
There were two prior stations at Oriole. In 1906, the Canadian Northern Railway built the first station on the south side of York Mills west of Don Mills Road, but named it Duncan Station since it was located on property previously owned by William Duncan III. When the Canadian National Railways took over the Canadian Northern in 1923, it closed Duncan Station moving it's building away from the tracks, and replacing it by a flag stop on the north side of York Mills Road. The station name was changed to Oriole. The original station building was demolished in 1987. The second station was closed and demolished in 1978.

South of Oriole Station and York Mills Road, there used to be a junction to the Oriole Spur (a.k.a. Leaside Spur), a branch line built in 1916 that connected to the Canadian Northern's maintenance facilities in Leaside serving industries along the way. Today, the Oriole Spur has been converted into the Don Mills Trail, a walking and cycling path.

Layover facility
Metrolinx is planning to construct a layover facility for GO trains along the Richmond Hill GO Line south of Oriole GO Station near York Mills Road. Trains would be stored at the facility between the morning and afternoon peak periods, and would access the facility by shuttling from and to Union Station.

Until this facility is ready, GO Transit will use Rosedale Siding, located in the Don Valley between Bayview Avenue and the Don River, as a temporary stage facility. Originally, the new facility was to be in the Don Valley under the Prince Edward Viaduct. However, this location drew much criticism from local politicians, residents and conservationists. By March 2023, Metrolinx had abandoned plans to use this location.

References

External links

 Oriole GO Station construction at GO Transit

GO Transit railway stations
Railway stations in Toronto
North York
Railway stations in Canada opened in 1978
1978 establishments in Ontario